Cardiff International Arena (formerly known as Cardiff International Arena & Convention Centre and later, for sponsorship reasons, Motorpoint Arena Cardiff) is an indoor exhibition centre and events arena located in Cardiff, Wales, and was opened on 10 September 1993 by singer Shirley Bassey. It is Cardiff's largest purpose-built exhibition facility and its former name was due to a sponsorship agreement from 2011 to 2022. The upstairs of the building is known as the World Trade Centre.

The arena contains a number of function areas, the largest being the main arena which has hosted many national and international events, such as concerts, sports and comedy performances.

History

The arena was opened on 10 September 1993, by Shirley Bassey, in front of 5,500 fans. The concert was later televised on BBC One on 30 July 1994.

On 1 March 2011, the Cardiff International Arena was renamed Motorpoint Arena Cardiff, for sponsorship reasons, after the car sales company entered into an agreement regarding the naming rights to the Arena for five years in what was called "a seven-figure investment". Other names who have performed in the arena are among Westlife, Kylie Minogue, One Direction, Jessie J, Anastacia, Steps, JLS, Jason Derulo and Mariah Carey. The arena is owned by the US media giant Live Nation UK.

In March 2015, the venue's 3000th event was marked by a show headlined by singer Katherine Jenkins. In July 2016, Motorpoint extended its naming rights contract with the arena until at least 2021. This included a complete re-branding of the building including installation of outdoor LED signage on the arena's towers.

The arena reverted back to its original CIA name on 22 September 2022 after being named Motorpoint Arena Cardiff since March 2011.

Facilities
The main arena offers 4,500 square metres of exhibition space, and is very versatile, for the number of different events that take place at the arena. Full capacity can reach 7,500, in a standing layout and 5,000, for a fully seated event.

There are over 30 additional areas, including a conference suite (groups of up to 460) and four executive boardrooms.

Comedy
Comedian Lee Evans has brought four tours XL Tour, Big, Roadrunner and Monsters to the arena, Evans played his last show before retiring from stand-up at the arena from 24 to 30 November 2014.

Music
The venue has hosted a number of concerts since it opened, with artists such as Sigrid, George Ezra, Richard Ashcroft, Mumford & Sons, Two Door Cinema Club, Fatboy Slim, The 1975, Bring Me The Horizon, Céline Dion, Kylie Minogue, Beyoncé, Lady Gaga, Katy Perry, Rihanna, Metallica, Enrique Iglesias, The Script, New Kids on the Block, Take That, Paloma Faith, Michael Bublé, Steps, Craig David, Gary Barlow, James Blunt, Kelly Clarkson, Avril Lavigne, Liam Gallagher, Iron Maiden, Alice Cooper, Dio, Twisted Sister, Meat Loaf, Pink, Gwen Stefani, Girls Aloud, Sugababes, Gabrielle, LeAnn Rimes, Culture Club, Jessie J, Little Mix, Dolly Parton, Anastacia, Fifth Harmony, Leona Lewis, Ellie Goulding, Olly Murs, Ella Eyre, John Newman, Westlife, Dua Lipa, Nicki Minaj, Noel Gallagher's High Flying Birds, The Killers, Biffy Clyro, The Prodigy, The Nolans, The Beach Boys, Frankie Valli, McFly, Panic! at the Disco, Dropkick Murphys, Fall out Boy, You Me At Six, Lostprophets, Blink 182, All American Rejects, Ben Howard, Arctic Monkeys, Paramore, Yungblud and local favourites Catatonia, Kids in Glass Houses and the Manic Street Preachers taking to the stage.

Sport
In 1999, the Cardiff International Arena hosted the (Nine-ball) World Professional Pool Championship. The official WPA World Nine-ball Championship was hosted at the Cardiff International Arena between 2000 and 2003.

Since 2007, the arena has been one of the Premier League Darts venues, including the semi-finals and finals night of the 2008 Premier League Darts on 26 May 2008. The PDC Champions League of Darts was held in the arena in 2016 and 2017. Between 2016 and 2017 the arena hosted the Champions League of Darts.

In February 2015, the Welsh Open snooker championship was transferred from the Newport Centre (where it had taken place since 2005) to the arena. In 2021 the event transferred to back to Newport at the Celtic Manor Resort.

Professional wrestling
In 2019, WWE's NXT UK brand announced the venue would host the second ever TakeOver event for the brand, NXT UK TakeOver: Cardiff. This took place on 31 August 2019 and was the first TakeOver to take place in Wales.

Images of the Cardiff International Arena

References

External links

 
Cardiff International Arena

Sports venues in Cardiff
Indoor arenas in Wales
Music venues in Cardiff
Darts venues
Event venues established in 1993
Snooker venues
Exhibition and conference centres in Wales